The Century Initiative is a Canadian charity that aims to increase Canada's population to 100 million by 2100. This would include increasing the population of "Mega-regions", such as the Greater Toronto Area, from 8.8 to 33.5 million, the Greater Vancouver region, from 3.3 to 11.9 million, and the National Capital Region, from 1.4 to 4.8 million. The Century Initiative intends to reach its population goal by reversing the falling fertility rate through a massive increase in immigration, and to supplement it by investing in economic development around "mega-regions." The official mission statement reads as “Growing our population to 100 million by 2100 would reduce the burden on government revenues to fund health care, old age security, and other services.” Century Initiative forecasts predict that without changes to Canadian immigration policy, the population of Canada will increase to only 53 million people by the end of the century.

The Century Initiative was co-founded by Mark Wiseman and Dominic Barton, who also led the Trudeau government’s Advisory Council on Economic Growth.
The Initiative is supported by former Conservative Prime Minister Brian Mulroney and by influential Liberal Party advisors including advisors to former Minister of Finance Bill Morneau. The Century Initiative has been listed on Canada's lobbyist registry since 2021 and has organized meetings with the immigration minister's office, the minister's parliamentary secretary and Conservative and NDP MPs.

In March 2021, The Globe and Mail hosted a virtual event in partnership with the Century Initiative examining key indicators of the Century Initiative’s progress towards growing Canada’s population to 100 million by the year 2100. The Century Initiative has been written about by columnists including Andrew Coyne, Terence Corcoran, and Doug Saunders, who subsequently authored the book Maximum Canada: Why 35 Million Canadians Are Not Enough.

Criticism and Debate
The initiative is advanced by Dominic Barton, a man who served as the managing director of a multinational consulting firm. At this time his national allegiance is unknown. Barton has had many dealings with both authoritarian and kleptocratic regimes. The initiative is also advanced by Mark Wiseman who previously was employed by BlackRock. BlackRock owns $35 billion in real estate and it could possibly benefit from a real estate bubble. 

The initiative may lead to the largest population expansion of any advanced country in human history.

No advanced country has embraced a mass immigration policy while retaining a policy of multiculturalism. The initiative will accelerate population growth in Canada, as well as multiculturalism, and the consequences of this are unknown. At this time the initiative does not have provincial or local backing or support.

Connections to BlackRock
The Century Initiative Board of Directors is chaired by co-founder Mark Wiseman, who was BlackRock's Global Head of Active Equities and ran Blackrock's Alternative Investment division at the time that the Initiative was founded BlackRock's Alternative Investment division includes the firm's international real estate investment portfolio and is reported to be actively purchasing single family homes. The Century Initiative's co-founder, Dominic Barton, is married to Geraldine Buckingham, BlackRock's Asia Pacific chief, which has previously generated conflict of interest concerns.

Connections to McKinsey
The Century Initiative was founded by Dominic Barton while he was still head of McKinsey & Company. As of January 2023, the Century Initiative has a current McKinsey executive on its board of executives. The Century Initiative has been connected to a scandal over McKinsey consulting expenses by Justin Trudeau's government, in which whistleblowers have highlighted McKinsey's large and growing influence over Canadian immigration policy. Dominic Barton also served as the Trudeau government’s ambassador to China from 2019 to 2021, and left the position during an embroiling national security issue.

Mega-regions
The Century Initiative envisions the Canada of 2100 as a nation of mega-regions, which it defines interlocking areas with more than one city centre and a typical population of 5 million or more.

References 

Charities based in Canada
Lobbying in Canada
2011 establishments in Canada
Organizations based in Toronto